The 1987 Pan American Games was the first to hold canoeing events.

Medal table

Men's events

Women's events 

1987
Events at the 1987 Pan American Games